Worth Valley is a ward in the City of Bradford Metropolitan District Council, West Yorkshire. The population of the ward taken at the 2011 Census was 14,387. It is named after the River Worth that runs through the valley to the town of Keighley where it joins the River Aire. In the north it is bounded by North Yorkshire, in the west by Lancashire and in the south by Calderdale District.

Ward
Worth Valley ward is a semi-rural area and the largest of the six wards that make up the constituency of Keighley in West Yorkshire. Historically, it elects mostly Conservative councillors, except in 2004, when a representative of the British National Party was returned to Bradford District Council. The previous councillor stated that this was a protest vote that "went disastrously wrong."

It contains the Keighley villages of Oakworth, Oldfield, Haworth, Cross Roads, Oxenhope and Stanbury; areas of farmland; and large expanses of moorland. Its attractive villages, particularly Haworth and its Pennine landscape are at the heart of Brontë Country and attract many visitors.

Councillors 
Worth Valley ward is represented on Bradford Council by three Conservative councillors; Rebecca Poulsen, Chris Herd and Russell Brown. In 2017, before the 2018 elections, Glen Miller was deselected as a prospective councillor by the Keighley and Ilkley Conservative Association. Miller stated that he tended to speak his mind and that he had disagreed with a policy about letting members of other political parties leave and join the Conservatives.

 indicates seat up for re-election.
 indicates a by-election.

Notable people with Worth Valley links 
The following people were born in the Worth Valley, have lived there in the past or are currently resident in the valley.

 Brontë Sisters, lived in the village of Haworth
 Anne. (1820–1849), Novelist
 Charlotte, (1816–1855), Novelist
 Emily, (1818–1848), Novelist
 Branwell Brontë, (1817–1848), painter and poet
 Rev Patrick Brontë, (1777–1861), clergyman and writer
 Eric Pickles, Conservative MP, started his political career as a councillor in the Worth Valley Ward

References

External links
 BCSP (Internet Explorer only)
 BBC election results
 Council ward profile (pdf)
 http://worthvalley.org

Wards of Bradford